Ostrožno Brdo is a small village in the hills northwest of Ilirska Bistrica in the Inner Carniola region of Slovenia.

The local church in the settlement is dedicated to Saint Anthony of Padua and belongs to the Parish of Suhorje.

References

External links
Ostrožno Brdo on Geopedia

Populated places in the Municipality of Ilirska Bistrica